Khosro Heydari (born September 14, 1983) is a retired Iranian football player who mostly played as a defender for Esteghlal.

Club career
After his excellent performances for Pas he finally accepted the offer from Esteghlal F.C. and was one of the key players in 2008–09 for Esteghlal F.C. to win the league. He continued his excellent performances the season after and was the most influential player of the team. He left Esteghlal F.C. in 2010, joining Sepahan with a 2-year contract. He won the league with Sepahan and was transferred back to Esteghlal F.C. on 23 July 2011 on a two-year deal and won the Hazfi Cup in his first season and Iran Pro League next season. He extended his contract with Esteghlal on 13 July 2013, keeping him at the club until 2016. On 19 June 2016, he signed another three-year contract extension, keeping him at the club through 2019. He announced he will be retired from football at the end of the 2018–19 season. He played his last game for Esteghlal in a 2–1 win against Sepidrood on 16 May 2019.

Club career statistics

1 Statistics Incomplete.
 Assist goals

International career

Khosro Heydari was a member of Iran national under-23 football team, participating in the 2006 Asian Games. He was called up to the senior squad in June 2007 for the West Asian Football Federation Championship 2007. He made his debut for Iran in a match vs Palestine. He played in 2010 FIFA World Cup qualification and 2014 FIFA World Cup qualification for Team Melli. He also featured in 2011 AFC Asian Cup qualification and 2015 AFC Asian Cup qualification. He performed for Team Melli in West Asian Football Federation Championship 2010, 2011 Asian Cup, 2014 World Cup and 2015 Asian Cup.

International caps

Honours

Club
Pas
Iran Pro League: 2005–06 (Runner-up)

Esteghlal 
Iran Pro League: 2008–09, 2012–13
Hazfi Cup: 2011–12, 2017–18
Sepahan
Iran Pro League: 2010–11

References

External links

 khosroheydari iranleague
 Iran Pro League Stats
 Profile at ligol.pl

Iranian footballers
Iran international footballers
Association football midfielders
Persian Gulf Pro League players
Esteghlal F.C. players
F.C. Aboomoslem players
Paykan F.C. players
Pas players
Sepahan S.C. footballers
1983 births
Living people
2011 AFC Asian Cup players
Asian Games bronze medalists for Iran
2014 FIFA World Cup players
2015 AFC Asian Cup players
People from Tehran
Asian Games medalists in football
Footballers at the 2006 Asian Games
Medalists at the 2006 Asian Games